Timothy J. Feddersen (born 1958) is an American economist and political scientist. He is the Wendell Hobbs Professor of Managerial Politics, Professor of Managerial Economics & Decision Sciences, and Chair of the Personnel Committee at the Kellogg School of Management at Northwestern University. He earned his B.A. degree in mathematics from Indiana University in 1985 and his Ph.D. in political science from the University of Rochester in 1993. He was elected to the American Academy of Arts & Sciences in 2015.

References

External links
Faculty page

1958 births
Living people
21st-century American economists
American political scientists
Kellogg School of Management faculty
University of Rochester alumni
Indiana University alumni
Fellows of the American Academy of Arts and Sciences